Compliance buyouts (sometimes referred to as amnesty buyouts) allow National Hockey League (NHL) teams to buy-out a player's contract by paying him two-thirds of the remaining value of a contract over twice the remaining length of the contract. If the player is under 26 years old, then the team may pay the player just one-third of the remaining contract value. In ordinary-course buyouts, the team's NHL salary cap hit for the player is stretched over a period of twice the remaining length of the contract. Compliance buyouts follow the same formula as ordinary-course buyouts but do not count against the cap.

Due to the 2012–13 NHL lockout, the salary cap was not to increase to the projected $70.2 million, so each team was therefore granted two compliance buyouts to be exercised after the 2012–13 season and/or after the 2013–14 season that would not count against the salary cap in any further year in order to better comply with a lower than expected cap value, regardless of the player's age. After using a compliance buyout on a player, that player is prohibited from rejoining the team that bought him out for one year; the NHL deemed that the re-signing of a player following a trade and a subsequent compliance buyout would be ruled as cap circumvention.

Following the 2012–13 NHL lockout each team was granted one accelerated compliance buyout in order for teams to meet the lowered salary cap. This could be used on a player with a salary cap hit of US$3 million or more before the regular season began. If an accelerated compliance buyout is used, that team will only have one more compliance buyout left, and they must use it after the completion of the 2012–13 season (and before the start of 2013–14 season). The player's cap hit is applied in full to the team's salary cap for the 2012–13 season, but for no season after, regardless of contract length.

Available during the off-season in 2013 and 2014, amnesty buyouts begin 48 hours after the conclusion of the Stanley Cup Finals.

In 2013, it began 48 hours after the conclusion of the Stanley Cup, and ended on July 4, 2013. The second NHL compliance buyout period opened on June 16, 2014, and ran through June 30, 2014, with 26 teams having one or more compliance buyout available to be used.

There was also a period for unlimited compliance buyouts following the 2004–05 NHL lockout from July 23–29, 2005. Only nine teams opted to take advantage of this period, buying out a total of 13 players, and only three teams bought out more than one player. The players: Chris Gratton (Colorado), Andrew Cassels and Scott Lachance (Columbus), Pierre Turgeon (Dallas), Derian Hatcher, Darren McCarty, and Ray Whitney (Detroit), Mathieu Biron (Florida), Matt Johnson (Minnesota), Bobby Holik (NY Rangers), Tony Amonte and John LeClair (Philadelphia), and Brian Savage (Phoenix). Due to a contract dispute between the Toronto Maple Leafs and Owen Nolan, Toronto arranged with the league to utilize a compliance buyout on Nolan if it was ruled he had the right to exercise a contract option for the 2005–06 season.

Combining the 2005 and 2013–2014 compliance buyout periods, 21 teams bought out at least one player. The Detroit Red Wings have bought out the most players (5), while the Philadelphia Flyers (4) and New York Rangers (3) are the only other teams with more than two. Nine franchises (eleven if the Seattle Kraken and Vegas Golden Knights are included) have never used a compliance buyout. They are the Anaheim Ducks, Boston Bruins, Carolina Hurricanes, Los Angeles Kings, Nashville Predators, Ottawa Senators, Pittsburgh Penguins, St. Louis Blues, and Winnipeg Jets (formerly the Atlanta Thrashers).

List of compliance buyouts
The following is an unofficial list of all the compliance buyouts that have been used:

 Notes

 Accelerated compliance buyout

References

NHL Collective Bargaining Agreement reference: Section 50.5 (c-iii-A )(P. 205-208)

National Hockey League